Vĩnh Lộc may refer to several places in Vietnam:

Vĩnh Lộc District, a district in Thanh Hóa Province
Vĩnh Lộc, An Giang, a commune in An Phú District
Vĩnh Lộc, Bạc Liêu, a commune and village in Hồng Dân District
Vĩnh Lộc, Tuyên Quang, district capital of Chiêm Hoá District